African Economic Outlook is an annual reference book-journal which focuses on the economics of most African countries. It reviews the recent economic situation and predicts the short-term interrelated economic, social, and political evolution of all African economies. The report is published by the OECD Development Centre, the African Development Bank, the United Nations Development Programme and United Nations Economic Commission for Africa. It was established in 2002.

Scope
This annual publication covers economic policy, conditions, and outlook for most of the economies of Africa. It includes macroeconomic forecasting for the current and the following year, combined with an analysis of its social and political context. Comparative synthesis of the prospects for African countries in the context of global economics is part of this periodical. Finally, a statistical appendix currently has 24 tables comparing economic and social variables across all the countries of Africa.

For example,  topic coverage includes the international environment, macroeconomic performances in Africa, structural changes, economic reforms,  external financial flows to Africa,  assessment of privatization policies, and reduction of poverty as a challenge for the future. Moreover, coverage includes governance, political issues, regional trade policies, and regional integration.

See also

African Economic Community
Economy of the African Union

References

External links 
 

African studies journals
Economics journals
Annual journals
International development in Africa
Economy of Africa
Multilingual journals
Publications established in 2002